Riff Raff was a British progressive rock band formed by keyboardist Tommy Eyre in 1972. The band was a continuation on the back of drummers (and Harrow School of Art friends) Rod Coombes' and Joe Czarnecki (aka Joe Peter)'s project originally called 'Crikey' which started in 1969 and completed in 1970, when Coombes had to accept growing tour commitments with Juicy Lucy. These sessions comprised half of the Riff Raff album Outside Looking In, in which Coombes wrote half the songs.

Riff Raff later went on to release two albums to lukewarm response; however, their use of jazz and hard-edged rock garnered them a large underground following. Riff Raff also released the single "Copper Kettle".

Personnel
Bud Beadle - saxophone
Rod Coombes - drums, percussion and songwriter
Joe Czarnecki aka Joe Peters - drums, percussion
Aureo De Souza - drums
Tommy Eyre - keyboards, vocals
Pete Kirtley - guitar, vocals
Roger Sutton - bass guitar, vocals
Steve Gregory - woodwind
Joanna Newman - vocals
Joe O'Donnell - viola

Discography
Riff Raff (1973)
Original Man (1974)
Outside Looking In (1999) (originally recorded in 1969)

References

External links
Riff Raff Information

British progressive rock groups
Musical groups established in 1972